Alan Olson is a Republican member of the Montana Legislature.  He was elected for Senate District 23 in 2010.  Previously he served 4 terms in the House of Representatives.  Olson previously worked for Halliburton Services and was Chief for Bull Mountain Fire Department.

References

External links
 Home page

Living people
1956 births
Republican Party Montana state senators
People from Havre, Montana
Republican Party members of the Montana House of Representatives